Everything Is Fine is a French Canadian film directed by Yves-Christian Fournier. It tells the story of a young man trying to cope with the simultaneous suicide of his four friends.

Reactions 
"Tout est parfait is the best film of 2008, and one of the most powerful to come out of this province in years." (The Gazette)

Awards
The film won the 2009 Claude Jutra Award for best feature film by a first-time director at the 29th Genie Awards.

Cast

References

External links
 
 
 

Quebec films
2008 films
Canadian drama films
Best First Feature Genie and Canadian Screen Award-winning films
2008 directorial debut films
French-language Canadian films
2000s Canadian films